Cyrtodactylus triedrus, also known as the spotted bent-toed gecko, Sri Lanka gecko, spotted bow-fingered gecko, or spotted ground gecko, is a species of gecko endemic to island of Sri Lanka.

Habitat & Distribution
It is a small, dark, turnip-tailed gecko from Sri Lanka's midhills below 700m. Known localities include Peradeniya, Gammaduwa, Kithulgala, and Knuckles Mountain Range.

Description
The body is with small, granular scales, intermixed with larger keeled scales. Midventral scales are cycloid and imbricate, numbering 35. Toes are short. Males have 3-4 pre-anal pores and 3-4 femoral pores. 
The dorsum is dark brown to nearly black, typically with small white spots that are edged with brown color. Venter is light brown.

Ecology & Diet
It is found under and inside decaying fallen logs. It is found inside houses, under piles of wood.
Its diet presumably consists small arthropods.

Reproduction
Females typically lay 2 eggs and are produced at a time between the months of April and July. Hatchlings measure 23mm and lack the pale spots on the dorsum.

References

 http://reptile-database.reptarium.cz/species?genus=Cyrtodactylus&species=triedrus
 

Reptiles of Sri Lanka
Cyrtodactylus
Reptiles described in 1864
Taxa named by Albert Günther